Joel Bernard (born December 8, 1963) is a Canadian conservative politician.

Political career

Provincial
He was elected to the Legislative Assembly of New Brunswick, representing Nepisiguit, in the general election of 1999 and became deputy speaker of the Legislature.  He was defeated in his bid for a second term in the 2003 election by former Member of the Legislative Assembly (MLA) Frank Branch. Branch had represented the area from 1970 to 1995, when he retired and did not seek re-election.

Bernard was one of several defeated Progressive Conservative MLAs who were appointed to government positions by Premier Bernard Lord following their defeat in the 2003 election.  These appointments were widely criticized as excessive patronage by the media and the opposition Liberals.

Bernard had been appointed to oversee and economic development fund for the Restigouche-Baie des Chaleurs region. He took a leave of absence from his position in March 2004 to be a Conservative candidate in the 2004 federal election.

Federal
In late April 2005, Bernard announced he would be a candidate for the Conservative nomination for the riding of Ottawa—Orléans for the next federal election.  On May 16, he was defeated by Royal Galipeau, a former member of the Liberal Party of Canada, for the nomination by a margin of 174 to 126, who went on to win the seat in the election.

From 2006 to 2008, Bernard held the position of Senior Policy Advisor in the office of Stockwell Day, Minister of Public Safety in the new Conservative government.

In the 2008 federal election, the Conservative Party brought Bernard to Nova Scotia to run against Conservative-turned-Independent Bill Casey in the riding of Cumberland–Colchester–Musquodoboit Valley. On election night, Casey was re-elected by over 22,000 votes, with Bernard finishing third, polling just under 9%.

Bernard was the Senior Policy Advisor for aerospace, procurements, industrial regional benefits and the auto file to Tony Clement, Minister of Industry Canada, until he left the position in 2010. Since then, he has held several positions of Senior Policy Advisor for Fisheries & Oceans Canada, International Development and La francophonie. He is presently employed as a Parliamentary Affairs Advisor for Pierre Paul-Hus, the Shadow minister for Public Safety, Border Security and Emergency Preparedness and the Member of Parliament for Charlesbourg – Haute – Saint-Charles.

In March 2019, Bernard won the Ottawa—Vanier Conservative nomination contest, becoming their candidate for the 2019 federal election.

Personal life
He lives in Ottawa, Ontario with his wife Catherine and his two children, Lilianne and Samuel. Joel's sister-in-law is the former special assistant of former Chief of Staf Nigel Wright, and later former personnel manager of the Office of the Prime Minister of Canada Monica Bernard.

Joel Bernard is an evangelical Christian.

Electoral record

Federal

Provincial

References

1963 births
Living people
21st-century Canadian civil servants
Progressive Conservative Party of New Brunswick MLAs
People from Restigouche County, New Brunswick
21st-century Canadian politicians
Conservative Party of Canada candidates for the Canadian House of Commons